Callictita cyara is a species of butterfly of the family Lycaenidae. It is found in New Guinea.

Subspecies
Callictita cyara cyara (south-eastern New Guinea to Papua New Guinea)
Callictita cyara cyabla Parsons, 1986 (New Guinea)
Callictita cyara cyelsa Parsons, 1986 (New Guinea)

References

Butterflies described in 1908
Polyommatini